Canyelles may refer to:

 Canyelles (town), a town in the province of Barcelona, Catalonia, Spain
 Canyelles (neighbourhood), a neighbourhood in the city of Barcelona, Catalonia, Spain
 Canyelles (Barcelona Metro), a metro station in the city of Barcelona, Catalonia, Spain